ARKEN Museum of Modern Art is a private non-for-profit charity, state authorised, contemporary art museum in Ishøj near Copenhagen, the capital of Denmark. The museum is amongst Denmark's major contemporary and modern art ventures, encompassing significant international cultural works and exhibitions. Arken is located in the suburb-city Ishøj, close to Køge (Køge bugt), twenty kilometres south of Copenhagen, Denmark. Arken museum was designed by 25-year old architect student Søren Robert Lund in a distinct architectural form and was authorised by Copenhagen County. It was inaugurated on 15 March 1996 and was conceived by Queen Margrethe; her majesty of Denmark.

Arken Museum of Modern Art's collection offers major works of over 400 Danish, Scandinavian and International post-war art, including renowned creations by Damien Hirst, Olafur Eliasson, Anselm Reyle Shirin Neshat, Wolfgang Tillmans, Danish / Norwegian duo Ingar Dragset and Michael Elmgreen and many more. Arken, due to its synthesis of contemporary art, maritime architecture and landscape, is also acknowledged as a milestone in Danish Architecture. The museum showcases an overview of contemporary and modern art, presenting cultural and research-based exhibitions, architecture and design, sculptural artefacts, paintings, prints, site installations and mixed-media displays.

History, context and influences
Arken (Danish for ‘the Ark’), created and publicised in 1996, as an idiosyncratic and distinct architectural form, featuring an amassed assemble of international works. The history of Arken Museum of Modern Art has been embarked back to the museum's foundation of formulating a unit of international proportions and an active dynamic space.

The museum re-opened in January 2008 after major refurbishing, which included an expansion providing an additional 50% of gallery-space.

Before Arken: 1988-1992 
In the 20th century, there was a global growth of contemporary art museums, significantly the Museum of Modern Art was opened in 1988. Collectively, this influenced a rise and a prominent increase in cultural institutions to showcase both local and international art. It has played a major role in the development and collection of contemporary art.

In 1988, an architectural competition for the creation of a new contemporary art museum in southwest of Copenhagen took place. This resulted in 25-year-old student architect, Søren Robert Lund effectively winning first-prize of the competition and awarded the commission of its design which was finalised in 1992. The title "Arken" was also chosen from the open architectural competition. The initial idea was for Arken to be located on the beach as a characteristic maritime architectural form to reflect its Danish title. Due to conservation reasons, the museum was built back behind low sand dunes and between a lagoon.

1996-1999 
Prior to the museum's inauguration, there were several years of significant social, cultural and political changes within Denmark, in the late 20th Century. In the 1960s, the municipalities south of Copenhagen showcased a rapid growth in residents, particularly immigrants of Kurdish, Turkish and Pakistani nationalities. A trend that further strengthened the area's multicultural development was the migration of inner-city residents to the districts south of Copenhagen. This gave rise to an influx of multicultural regions in Denmark, in turn, fusing local and international art. The chairman of the museum was Svend Jakobsen between 1997 and 2007.

21st Century 
Arken, as a cultural institution in transition, undertook two major renovation and expansion designed by original architect Søren Robert Lund alongside C.F. Møller Architects. The museum encompassed permanent collections and donations of works from 2005-2008 by Damien Hirst, Marc Quinn, Mona Hatoum, Jeppe Hein, Jeff Koons and Elmgreen & Dragset

ARKEN also published the Arken Bulletin which is a place of discussion amongst international academia on artistic theory and museology.

Each year ARKEN awards the  'ARKENs kunstpris' prize of 100,000 Danish kroner to a contemporary artist.

Architecture
The museum is designed and built as a deconstructive, nautically- inspired architectural form. In a cultural institution, this style of architecture has come under public notice through Museum of Modern Art's 1988 Deconstructivist Architecture exhibition in New York, featuring notable works of  Daniel Libeskind, Frank Gehry, and Zaha Hadid. Deconstructivist architecture has been invigorated publicly by Jacques Derrida, Peter Eisenman and Bernard Tschumi. This wave of deconstruction in architectural form became prominent in Europe in the 1980s, a style Søren Robert Lundin used to design Arken. The museum reflects this movement and extension from the rational approach of modernism. Architectural deconstructivism requires an existence of an archetypal construction, a strong dialect of conventional presence to experiment flexibility against. Arken museum is conceived as a shipwreck architectural form, embodying spatial envelopes, altered geometric massing's and subversion, showcasing an effective act of deconstruction.  

Deconstructivist architecture, with its inclination towards deformation and dislocation, bears angular forms and abstract geometries, as defined in Arken's exterior and interior space. The museum displays deconstructivism by "breaking down the epitomised idea of a building, exposing its inside to its outside, reconstructing a variety of spaces, and forcing different access points."

Arken's formal plan incorporates assembled building parts, split and fragmented to create a fragmented ship form and a floor plan with slanted angles. Contrasting colours of grey to red walls, large open rooms to small rooms, and slanted building angles with curved galleries creates visible deconstruction. Arken models geometric imbalance and fragmentation to oppose modernism notions of "form follows function", "truth to material" and "purity of form."

Extensions 
Since its inauguration in 1966, the museum has undergone architectural and spatial reformation, responding to contemporary agendas of social change. Arken's expansion and periodic transformation increased public accessibility space by 50% compared to its initial built space in 1996, making the space open to change and a "contemporary museological practice." The expansion enabled Arken to shift its approach from presenting its archives of paintings, design and artworks on paper towards a display of integrated large sculptural masses such as the UTOPIA Project.

Extension 1: 2008-2009 

The Museum reopened its doors publicly on 5 September 2009, following a renovation constructed by Arken's original architect Søren Robert Lund and design partner, CF Møller Architect. The refurbishment consisted of 3 sections: a new sculpture gallery and main entrance by Søren Robert Lund, and education and experience workshop areas designed by Anna Maria Indrio of CF Møller Architects.

This extension significantly expanded Arken's new exhibit room to 1600m2, with the total area being 5000m2. The museum eradicated load-bearing walls or columns in all individual rooms, with the new exhibition hall structured as four white quadrants. Air conditioning structures were recessed into walls and security equipment was placed in floor boxed beneath steel plates, as C.F. Møller aimed to retain Arken's "existing facade’s rhythm and proportions."

The ceilings were lowered, and a new white box design was introduced. The annexes designers were Anna Maria Indrio as part of C.F.Møllers Tegnestue. Annie and Otto Johs. Detlefs’ Foundation financially backed up the new 1100 m2 extension, both donating approximately $10 million. The Detlefs Hall designed for displaying sculptural works and additional extension of educational workshop rooms were incorporated and refurbished across the north side of the building. The redesigned entrance leads to a  new 600m2 large room, functioning as the core of the museum, and being a central point for all rooms and amenities.

Extension 2: 2016 

The donation and financial investment for Arken's second extension was given by A.P.Møller and Hustru Chastine, McKinney Møller Foundation for General Purposes, enabling a water landscape. The excavation of extensive areas surrounding the gallery aimed to recognise the museum's characteristic maritime architecture and the surrounding landscape as an "Island of Art." The museum was moved to an island instead of the original plan of a beach-side placement due to environmental conservation factors that relate to the ecological balance and heritage. This extension provides maritime landscape of three road bridges, two pedestrian bridges, lagoons, native plantations and an architectural sculptural park. The refurbishment and extension were managed by Schul Landskabsarkitekter in conjunction with Møller and Grønborg, as a "transition from nature to culture."

The two pedestrian bridges were formally reconstructed diagonally on the museum's main axis to create a transitional causeway from the maritime landscape to the gallery.

Collections 
The Museum is a home to significant international cultural pieces and notable displays from a collective assemble of over 400 artists. The collection spans from  World War IIin 1945 to the present day, incorporating permanent caches by Damien Hirst, Olafur Eliasson, Ai Wei Wei, Ingar Dragset and Michael Elmgreen and Asger Jorn.

The Museum's collection incorporates two underpinning themes: (1) the human condition of modernistic man and (2) about art that questions the essential definition of art itself, via new media, mixed-materials and sculptural forms.

Situated on the left of the entrance on Arken's forecourt is a sculpture of a child riding a rocking horse, labelled Powerless Structures by Ingar Dragset and Michael Elmgreen  . The equestrian statue aims to honour the heroism of humanism.The image of a young boy astride his rocking horse encourages viewers to consider the less spectacular events in their lives, which are often the most important. The sculpture invokes life’s everyday activities and questions the tradition of monuments predicated on military victory or defeat.

Arken's archives hold a permanent display of British artist, Damien Hirst. Notable displays include: Love’s Paradox, 2007, Beautiful Strummerville Spin, 2010 and 2-Amino-5-Bromobenzotrifluoride, 2011 which measures 4.57 by 14.32 metres and is curated size-specific to fit in Arken.  These donations were by Dennis and Jytte Merla Dresing of the Merla Foundation. The collection of Damien Hirst works were assembled in a "Hirst Room", a gallery space dedicated to showcase his works. Other installations were a 2.5 metre bronzed statue entitled Saint Bartholomew, 2006 and a diamond entrusted skull titled, For the love of God. For the Love of God stretched all boundaries of art production as this human skull adorned with 8,601 diamonds cost £15 million to manufacture and was labelled with a stiff price of £50 million

Selected collection highlights

Exhibitions 
Arken highlights temporary annual exhibitions, wielding as thematic or artist-specific in nature to "safeguard Denmark's cultural heritage." There are on-going displays from 1996 to present, with a few notable and renowned works presented from the museum's portfolio.

UTOPIA Project 
A research-based series of exhibition that was held in 2008–2011 at Arken Museum of Modern Art, encompasses works of "A Chinese railroad, a floor and wall painting and a corridor full of fog". Throughout the years, each exhibition presented notable international artists, exploring the notions of "the good life" in large-scale installations. The exhibition consisted of two parts: Utopia Revisted and Utopian Positions, incorporating solo shows by Qiu Anxiong, Katharina Grosse, and Olafur Eliasson to showcase "the reformulations of utopia in contemporary art." Grosse stages the museum space as an intermediate state between physical, phenomenological reality and an imaginary, as yet unformulated ‘elsewhere’ that opens up in the painting installation’s brilliantly coloured clouds.

India: Art Now 
Held from the period 18 August 2012 to 13 January 2013, this exhibition was the biggest in Arken's history. It showcased Indian installation art by 13 artists and artist groups with the themes of the exhibition being "The Urban Space", "Identity and Everyday Life" and "Self-articulation." The museum displayed large-scale installation of saris, artistic replications of street vendors and high-tech shadow plays.

Van Gogh 
An exhibition held on 1 September 2018, holding 39 works curated by infamous artist Vincent van Gogh. It was the first exhibition in over fifty years dedicated to van Gogh's paintings and drawing in Denmark. The exhibition was in collaboration with Kröller-Müller Museum, exclusively focusing on humanity, religion and nature as thematic retrospect on Van Gogh's art.

Young Danish Art: Forecasting the Future 
An exhibition from 17 August 2019- 15 March 2020 applying an array of sculptures, installations, animated films and structures, featuring political and cultural changes in contemporary art. The exhibition presents overarching themes of "work culture, belonging and climate crisis."

See also
 Køge Bugt Strandpark

References

External links
 Official ARKEN Museum of Modern Art website — including ARKEN information in English

Literature 
 "Arken - Museum of Modern Art at Ishøj, Denmark" / Henrik Sten Møller. - in Living architecture, 1997, no. 15, pp. 116–133.
 "The Arken Art Museum extension". - in Arkitektur DK, 2008, vol. 52, no. 4, pp 32–38.
 ARKEN: The place and the art / edited by Christian Gether ... [et al.]. - Denmark, Arken Museum of Modern Art, 2016.

Museums in the Capital Region of Denmark
Buildings and structures in Ishøj Municipality
Modern art museums
Contemporary art galleries in Denmark
Buildings and structures completed in 1996
Art museums and galleries in Denmark
Art museums established in 1996
1996 establishments in Denmark